Matthew Keenan  is an Australian commentator and journalist who covers professional cycling.

Keenan commentates on major races Paris-Nice, Paris-Roubaix, Tour de France, Tour Down Under, and Vuelta a España from location for ITV, and Australia's SBS. The rest he covers remotely at the SBS Sydney office.

Keenan and Gracie Elvin co-hosted the Seven Network broadcast of the 2023 Santos Women’s Tour Down Under used by  Peacock in the US.

References

Sports journalists
Australian journalists
Living people